George William John Repton (1818 – 30 August 1906) was a British Conservative Party politician who held a seat in the House of Commons for most of the period from 1841 to 1885, first as a Member of Parliament (MP) for St Albans and then for Warwick.

Family
Repton was the son of George Stanley Repton and his wife Lady Elizabeth, daughter of John Scott, 1st Earl of Eldon.

He was educated at University College, Oxford, where he matriculated in 1838, and on 5 September 1848 he married Lady Jane Seymour FitzGerald, the only daughter of the Augustus FitzGerald, 3rd Duke of Leinster, who died on 3 November 1898.

His address was listed in 1881 as Odell Castle, Bedford.

Career
Repton was elected at the 1841 general election as an MP for the borough of St Albans in Hertfordshire, where he was re-elected in 1847. However, a Royal Commission found evidence of extensive bribery in elections at the borough, which was disenfranchised in 1852.

He was returned at the 1852 general election as an MP for the borough of Warwick, where he was re-elected in 1857, 1859, and 1865, but did not stand in 1868. He was again returned to the Commons from Warwick at the 1874 general election, re-elected in 1880, and retired from Parliament when the parliamentary borough of Warwick was abolished at the 1885 general election.

References

External links
 

1818 births
1906 deaths
Conservative Party (UK) MPs for English constituencies
Politics of St Albans
People from the Borough of Bedford
Alumni of University College, Oxford
UK MPs 1841–1847
UK MPs 1847–1852
UK MPs 1852–1857
UK MPs 1857–1859
UK MPs 1859–1865
UK MPs 1865–1868
UK MPs 1874–1880
UK MPs 1880–1885